The Adams County Courthouse is located in Gettysburg, Pennsylvania. It was added to the National Register of Historic Places on October 1, 1974.

History and architectural features
Built in 1858, the Adams County Courthouse was first occupied in 1859. The architect was Stephen Decatur Button of Philadelphia, with John R. Turner of Carlisle implementing its construction.

The courthouse is two stories high, three bays wide, six bays deep and constructed of red brick, which was originally painted gray. Rear wings were added in 1895. During the Battle of Gettysburg the building served as both a command post and as a hospital, for both Union and Confederate armies.

The Adams County Courthouse was added to the National Register of Historic Places on October 1, 1974.

See also
Adams County, Pennsylvania
National Register of Historic Places listings in Adams County, Pennsylvania
List of state and county courthouses in Pennsylvania

References

External links

Courthouses on the National Register of Historic Places in Pennsylvania
Italianate architecture in Pennsylvania
Government buildings completed in 1858
Buildings and structures in Adams County, Pennsylvania
County courthouses in Pennsylvania
American Civil War hospitals
Clock towers in Pennsylvania
Historic American Buildings Survey in Pennsylvania
National Register of Historic Places in Adams County, Pennsylvania
1858 establishments in Pennsylvania